Piney Point may refer to:

Places
 Piney Point, Maryland
 Piney Point Village, Texas

Other uses
 Piney Point Formation, a geologic formation in Virginia
 Piney Point Light, an historic lighthouse in Maryland
 Piney Point phosphate plant, an industrial site in Florida

See also